2F-Viminol is a pyrrole derived opioid analgesic drug, which was originally developed by a team at the drug company Zambon in the 1960s. It is around twice as potent as the parent compound viminol, though unlike viminol, 2F-viminol has never passed clinical trials or been approved for medical use. 2F-Viminol has been sold as a designer drug, first being identified in Sweden in 2019. It is one of a number of structurally atypical opioid agonists to have appeared on the designer drug grey-market since broad controls over fentanyl analogues were introduced in China in 2015. It was made illegal in Sweden in August 2019 and in Latvia in November 2019.

See also 
 AP-237
 Brorphine
 Isotonitazene
 Z4349

References 

Analgesics
Designer drugs
Fluoroarenes
Opioids